Nobody's Bride is a 1923 American crime film directed by Herbert Blaché and written by Albert Kenyon. The film stars Herbert Rawlinson, Edna Murphy, Alice Lake, Harry von Meter, Frank Brownlee and Sidney Bracey. The film was released on April 2, 1923, by Universal Pictures.

Cast          
Herbert Rawlinson as Jimmy Nevins
Edna Murphy as Doris Standish
Alice Lake as Mary Butler
Harry von Meter as Morgan
Frank Brownlee as Vesher Charley
Sidney Bracey as Smithy
Phillips Smalley as Cyrus W. Hopkins
Robert Dudley as Uncle Peter Standish
Lillian Langdon as Mrs. Myrtle Standish

References

External links
 

1923 films
American crime films
1923 crime films
Universal Pictures films
Films directed by Herbert Blaché
American silent feature films
American black-and-white films
1920s English-language films
1920s American films